Yonathan Alfonso Suazo Cuevas (born 17 November 1989) is a Chilean professional footballer who plays as a right-back for Primera B de Chile side Deportes Recoleta.

External links
 
 

1989 births
Living people
People from Talcahuano
People from Concepción Province, Chile
People from Biobío Region
Chilean footballers
Association football fullbacks
C.D. Huachipato footballers
Deportes Concepción (Chile) footballers
Everton de Viña del Mar footballers
Ñublense footballers
Unión La Calera footballers
Naval de Talcahuano footballers
Deportes La Serena footballers
Magallanes footballers
Deportes Magallanes footballers
Puerto Montt footballers
Deportes Iberia footballers
Chilean Primera División players
Primera B de Chile players
Segunda División Profesional de Chile players